Cristeta Pasia Comerford (born October 27, 1962) is a Filipino-American chef who has been the White House executive chef since 2005. She is the first woman and first person of Asian origin to hold the post.

Early life
Cristeta Comerford was born as Cristeta Gomez Pasia in Sampaloc, Manila, the Philippines to Honesto Pasia, a public school assistant principal, and Erlinda Gomez. She grew up on Cataluña Street (now G. Tolentino) in Sampaloc, Manila. She completed her secondary education at the Manila Science High School. She attended the University of the Philippines, Diliman in Quezon City, majoring in food technology. However, she left school before completing the degree when she immigrated to the United States at the age of 23.

Career
Comerford's first job was at the Sheraton Hotel near O'Hare International Airport. She also worked at the Hyatt Regency hotel. After Chicago, she moved to Washington, D.C., and worked as a chef at two restaurants. She additionally spent six months in Vienna as a rotating chef. Comerford was recruited by White House executive chef Walter Scheib III in 1995 to work in the Clinton White House as an assistant chef.

After Scheib resigned in February 2005, Comerford was appointed White House executive chef by First Lady Laura Bush on August 14, 2005. Comerford is the first woman to hold this position. She reportedly was appointed to this position due to her handling of a large dinner that was held in honor of Indian prime minister Manmohan Singh.

On January 9, 2009, the Obama transition team announced that Comerford would be retained as the administration's head chef. Michelle Obama stated, "She is also the mom of a young daughter, and I appreciate our shared perspective on the importance of healthy eating and healthy families."

Comerford appeared on a special two-hour episode of Iron Chef America, originally broadcast on January 2, 2010. She was teamed up with Bobby Flay and competed against a team of Emeril Lagasse and Mario Batali.

As chef to a head of state, Comerford is a member of Le Club des Chefs des Chefs.

Personal life
She lives in Columbia, Maryland, with her husband, John, and their daughter Danielle.

References

Further reading
 Cris Comerford is Filipino And Proud, 25 August 2009
 
 
 
  
 Newsweek: No White House Food Fight
 Cristeta Comerford Of Manila Philippines
"White House Residence Staff behind scenes"  Smithsonian Magazine. November 2020. Retrieved May 14, 2021.

External links

 
 

1962 births
Chefs from Maryland
Filipino chefs
Filipino emigrants to the United States
Living people
People from Columbia, Maryland
People from Sampaloc, Manila
University of the Philippines Diliman alumni
White House Executive Chefs
Chefs from Washington, D.C.
Asian American chefs
American women chefs
21st-century American women